James McDonald (12 January 1877 – 17 October 1947) was Labor Party Member of the Tasmania House of Assembly for the electorate of Bass from 26 June 1915, when he was successful at a by-election, until his defeat at the election held on 26 June 1915. McDonald was elected to the Tasmanian Legislative Council for the electorate of Gordon on 2 May 1916, and held his seat until he was defeated on 2 May 1922, but he won office again for the Gordon on 8 May 1928, and held the seat until his death in 1947. He held Ministerial office as Attorney General from 1940–1946 and as Minister for Mines from 1946–1947.

McDonald served as president of the Tasmanian Branch of the Australian Workers Union, and was Secretary of the Tasmanian Branch of the Australian Labor Party from 1931–1935.

He was the father of John Joseph McDonald and  Thomas Raymond McDonald, who both served as  members of the Tasmanian House of Assembly.

References

Further reading 
 

1877 births
1947 deaths
Members of the Tasmanian House of Assembly
Members of the Tasmanian Legislative Council
Australian Labor Party members of the Parliament of Tasmania
20th-century Australian politicians